Pfalzgrafenweiler is a municipality in the district of Freudenstadt in Baden-Württemberg in southern Germany.

The Counts of Tübingen had a large castle located at Pfalzgrafenweiler in the 13th and 14th centuries. Between 1972 and 1975, the municipalities of Bösingen, Durrweiler, Edelweiler, Herzogsweiler, and Kälberbronn were added to Pfalzgrafenweiler.

Sister city
 La Loupe, Eure et Loir, France

References

Freudenstadt (district)
Württemberg